Low Orbit Ion Cannon (LOIC) is an open-source network stress testing and denial-of-service attack application written in C#. LOIC was initially developed by Praetox Technologies, however it was later released into the public domain and is currently available on several open-source platforms.

Use 
LOIC performs a DoS attack (or, when used by multiple individuals, a DDoS attack) on a target site by flooding the server with TCP, UDP, or HTTP packets with the intention of disrupting the service of a particular host. People have used LOIC to join voluntary botnets.

The software inspired the creation of an independent JavaScript version called JS LOIC, as well as LOIC-derived web version called Low Orbit Web Cannon. These enable a DoS from a web browser.

Countermeasures 
Security experts quoted by the BBC indicated that well-written firewall rules can filter out most traffic from DDoS attacks by LOIC, thus preventing the attacks from being fully effective. In at least one instance, filtering out all UDP and ICMP traffic blocked a LOIC attack.  Firewall rules of this sort are more likely to be effective when implemented at a point upstream of an application server's Internet uplink to avoid the uplink from exceeding its capacity.

LOIC attacks are easily identified in system logs, and the attack can be tracked down to the IP addresses used.

Notable uses

Project Chanology and Operation Payback 

LOIC was used by Anonymous (a group that spawned from the /b/ board of 4chan) during Project Chanology to attack websites from the Church of Scientology, once more to (successfully) attack the Recording Industry Association of America's website in October 2010, and it was again used by Anonymous during their Operation Payback in December 2010 to attack the websites of companies and organizations that opposed WikiLeaks.

Operation Megaupload 

In retaliation for the shutdown of the file sharing service Megaupload and the arrest of four workers, members of Anonymous launched a DDoS attack upon the websites of Universal Music Group (the company responsible for the lawsuit against Megaupload), the United States Department of Justice, the United States Copyright Office, the Federal Bureau of Investigation, the MPAA, Warner Music Group and the RIAA, as well as the HADOPI, all on the afternoon of January 19, 2012, through LOIC. In general, the attack hoped to retaliate against those who Anonymous members believed harmed their digital freedoms.

Origin of name 
The LOIC application is named after the ion cannon, a fictional weapon from many sci-fi works, video games, and in particular after its namesake from the Command & Conquer series. The artwork used in the application was a concept art for Command & Conquer 3: Tiberium Wars.

Legality 

While downloading and using the LOIC on one's own personal servers as a means of stress-testing is perfectly legal, at least in the United States, using the program to perform a DDoS attack on other parties could be considered a felony under the Computer Fraud and Abuse Act of 1986. This charge could result in up to 20 years of imprisonment, a fine or both.

See also 
 Fork bomb
 High Orbit Ion Cannon
 LAND
 Ping of death
 ReDoS
 Zemra
White Hat (computer security)

References

External links 

 Original LOIC with professional GUI
  LOIC Special Lowbandwidth Operating Weapon
 An improved version of LOWC forked from GoogleCode 
 LOIC IRC-0 IRC controlled version of LOIC-0
 LOIC SLOW Now With IRC and Webpage as C&C
 project development and downloads at SourceForge
 LOIC project development and downloads at GitHub
 Web version of LOIC at Google Code

Internet-based activism
Denial-of-service attacks
Free software programmed in C Sharp
Public-domain software
Public-domain software with source code
Anonymous (hacker group)
Botnets